Venton may refer to:

Ethel Venton (1891–1988), English secularist
Harley Venton (born 1953), American actor
Richie Venton (born 1953), Scottish trade unionist
Venton, Maryland, an unincorporated community in the United States
Venton hamlet, a hamlet within the civil parish of Drewsteignton, Devon, UK